Queen Ansun (18 April 1445 – 3 February 1499) of the Cheongju Han clan, was the second wife and queen consort of King Yejong, the 8th Joseon monarch. She was queen consort from 1468, until her husband's death in 1469, after which she was honoured as Queen Dowager Inhye (인혜왕대비) during her adoptive son, King Seongjong’s reign, and later as Grand Queen Dowager Inhye (인혜대왕대비) during her grandnephew, King Yeonsangun’s reign.

Life
Queen Ansan was born on 18 April 1445 into the Cheongju Han clan, as the 4th child and eldest daughter of Han Baek-ryun and his wife, Lady Im of the Pungcheon Im clan.

In 1462, Crown Princess Han, the Crown Princess Consort of the then Crown Prince Yi Hwang, died.

As Lady Han was born in the same year as her, she was chosen as a concubine of Crown Prince Yi Hwang in 1463 and received the title of So-hun (junior 5th rank); therefore known as Royal Consort So-hun of the Cheongju Han clan and lived temporarily within the residence of Dong Palace. Although she was not a primary consort, she received the treatment of one.

Royal Consort So-hun gave birth to two daughters and two sons, but only one prince and one princess survived through childhood, two of them being Yi Hyeon, Grand Prince Jean and Princess Hyeonsuk.

In 1468, the Crown Prince took over the throne and became the 8th Joseon King, after Sejo abdicated due to his illness, Consort So-hun was the one nominated by the former King to become the new Queen Consort. Since she was almost due at that time, guards were sent to her maternal home to guide the future Queen.

Her time as Queen Consort was short, as her husband died only 13 months after his ascension and to make the situation worse, her son, Grand Prince Jean, was deemed too young to be invested as the new King. Hence, her mother-in-law, Queen Dowager Jaseong and Han Myeong-hoe, the Chief State Councillor at that time, chose Prince Jasan, Han Myeong-hoe’s son-in-law and Yejong's nephew, to become the successor. Since the Queen was the former King’s wife, she was legally the mother of the new monarch, Yi Hyeol, King Seongjong, and was honored as Queen Dowager Inhye (인혜왕대비).

Conflicts happened when the King’s deceased father, Crown Prince Uigyeong, was posthumously declared as King, which made his widow, Crown Princess Consort Su (Seongjong's mother), a Queen Dowager (with the honorary name Insu). Because there was a need to determine the seniority between Inhye and Insu, Grand Queen Dowager Jaseong, as the eldest member of the Royal Family, solved the problem by declaring that Insu was entrusted with the task of protecting Yejong by the late Sejo of Joseon, implying her seniority above both King Yejong and Queen Dowager Inhye.

Seongjong's wife died in 1474, at the age 17, and was posthumously honoured as Queen Gonghye. The Ksitigarbha Pranidahana Sutra (The Great Vows of Ksitigarbha Bodhisattva) was commissioned by the three Queens Dowager through the Royal Treasury Agency. This Sutra is now considered an important artifact for the study of printing and Buddhism during the Joseon Dynasty.

Grand Queen Dowager Jaseong died in 1483, and was posthumously honoured as Queen Jeonghui. Her death made Inhye the most senior member of the royal family after Queen Insu.

After Seongjong's death, in 1494, Inhye was honoured as Grand Queen Dowager Inhye.

She died at the age of 53, during the reign of her grandnephew, Yeonsangun, and was posthumously known as Queen Ansun (안순왕후).

Family
Parents

 Father − Han Baek-ryun (1427 – 1474) (한백륜)
 a) Grandfather − Han Chang (1411 – 1451) (한창)
 b) Great-Grandfather − Han Gye-bok (한계복, 韓季復)
 c) Great-Great-Grandfather - Han Hye (한혜, 韓惠)
 d) Great-Great-Great-Grandfather - Han Sang-gyeong (한상경, 韓尙敬) (1360 - 1423)
 e) Great-Great-Great-Great-Grandfather - Han Soo (한수, 韓脩) (1333 - 1384)
 e) Great-Great-Great-Great-Grandmother - Lady Gwon of the Andong Gwon clan (안동 권씨, 安東 權氏)
 f) Great-Great-Great-Great-Great-Grandfather - Han Gong-ui (한공의, 韓公義)
 a) Grandmother − Lady Gim of the Seoheung Gim clan (서흥 김씨, 瑞興 金氏)
 Uncle - Han Suk-ryun (한숙륜, 韓叔倫)

 Mother − Internal Princess Consort Seoha of the Pungcheon Im clan (서하부부인 풍천 임씨, 西河府夫人 豊川 任氏) (? - 1472)
 Grandfather − Im Yu (임유, 任柔)

Sibling

 Older brother − Han Hwan (한환, 韓懽); Wife: Lady Jo (조씨)
 Older brother − Han Yeol (한열, 韓悅); Wife: Lady Yi of the Yeoju Yi clan (여주 이씨)
 Nephew − Han Gyeong-seok (한경석, 韓慶錫)
 Nephew − Han Gyeong-rok (한경록, 韓慶綠)
 Older brother − Han Hang (한항, 韓恒); Wife: Lady Hwang of the Changwon Hwang clan (창원 황씨)
 Nephew − Han Gyeong-seo (한경서, 韓慶瑞)
 Nephew − Han Gyeong-woon (한경운, 韓慶雲); adopted by Han Hwan
 Younger brother − Han Sun (한순, 韓恂) (1453 - 1541) 
 Sister-in-law - Lady Jo of the Pyeongyang Jo clan (평양 조씨)
 Nephew − Han Gyeong-hun (한경훈, 韓慶勳)
 Sister-in-law - Lady Lee
 Niece - Royal Consort Gwi-in of the Cheongju Han clan (1500 – 1571) (귀인 한씨); concubine of King Jungjong
 Unnamed grandnephew (1528)
 Younger sister − Princess Consort Cheonan of the Cheongju Han clan (천안군부인 청주 한씨); Husband: Yi Jun, Prince Gwiseong (귀성군 이준, 龜城君 李浚) (20 January 1441 - 3 February 1499)
 Adoptive nephew − Yi Jaeng, Prince Hoewon (회원군 이쟁, 會原君 李崢)
 Younger sister − Lady Han of the Cheongju Han clan (정부인 청주 한씨, 貞夫人 淸州 韓氏); Husband: Shin Soo-yeong (신수영, 愼守英) (? - 2 September 1506) 
 Nephew − Shin Hong-jae (신홍제, 愼弘濟)
 Nephew − Shin Hong-yu (신홍유, 愼弘猷)

Consort
 Yi Hwang, King Yejong (14 January 1450 – 31 December 1469) (조선 예종)
 Father-in-law − Yi Yu, King Sejo (세조, 世祖) (2 November 1417 - 23 September 1468)
 Mother-in-law − Queen Jeonghui of the Papyeong Yun clan (정희왕후 윤씨, 貞熹王后 尹氏) (8 December 1418 - 6 May 1483)

Issue

 Princess Hyeonsuk (1464 – 1502) (현숙공주)
 Son-in-law - Im Gwang-jae (? – 1495) (임광재).
 Yi Hyeon, Grand Prince Jean (13 February 1466 – 14 December 1525) (이현 제안대군).
 Daughter-in-law - Princess Consort Sangsan of the Sangju Gim clan (상산부부인 상주 김씨) (? - 1529)
 Daughter-in-law - Princess Consort Seungpyeong of the Suncheon Park clan (승평부부인 순천 박씨) (? - 1485)
 Adoptive grandson − Yi Pa, Prince Nakpung (낙풍군 이파, 李葩) (13 January 1515 - 15 September 1571)
 Princess Hyesun (September 1468 – 5 August 1469) (혜순공주)
 Unnamed grand prince (대군)

In popular culture
 Portrayed by Lee In-hye and Gim Eun-ju in the 1994 KBS2 TV series Han Myeong-hoe.
 Portrayed by Choi Eun-sook in the 1995 KBS2 TV series Jang Nok Soo.
 Portrayed by Gyeong In-seon in the 1998-2000 KBS TV series King and Queen. 
 Portrayed by Lee Jae-in in the SBS 2007-2008 TV series The King and I.
 Portrayed by Lee Yeon-doo and Gim Won-hee in the 2011-2012 JTBC TV series Insu, The Queen Mother.

Notes

References

External links

15th-century Korean people
1445 births
1499 deaths
Royal consorts of the Joseon dynasty
Korean queens consort
Cheongju Han clan
15th-century Korean women